Green Point Lighthouse may refer to:
Green Point Lighthouse, Natal, South Africa
Green Point Lighthouse, Cape Town, South Africa